Victoraş Constantin Iacob (born 14 October 1980 in Râmnicu Vâlcea, Vâlcea County, Romania) is a former Romanian professional footballer who played as striker.

Club career

Rocar București
Iacob started to play professional football at AS Rocar București and played his first match in Liga I on 4 December 1999 against FC Argeş Piteşti, but his team lost 3–1.

He helped his side reach the 2000–01 Romanian Cup final. Iacob played two seasons for AS Rocar București and scored 4 times in 30 games. In 2001, AS Rocar București were relegated to the second League and the owner of the team, Gigi Nețoiu moved along with part of the players, including Iacob to Universitatea Craiova.

Universitatea Craiova
He played 15 games for Universitatea Craiova and scored three times. While he was playing for Universitatea, Iacob suffered an injury which kept him away from the field for a long period of time.

Progresul București
In 2002, Iacob was transferred to Progresul București also known as FC Național where he played in 27 games and scored 4 times.

Oțelul Galați
During the 2003–04 season, Iacob played half of the season for Oțelul Galați and the other half at Rapid București. Iacob did not manage to meet the expectations of Rapid officials and returned to Oțelul Galați.

The 2004–05 season was the best of his career. In 28 games he scored 13 goals and was noticed by Mihai Stoica, the general manager of Steaua București, who signed him on a free transfer.

FC FCSB
His first season for FCSB was a good one and they won the championship. He played in 22 games and scored five times.

His first season in the UEFA Cup in 2004–05 led to an extended cup run for FCSB. They qualified from a group which included Standard Liège, Beşiktaş, Sampdoria and Athletic Bilbao and beat Valencia, a former UEFA Cup winner in the next knock out stage. However they were eliminated in the quarter finals by Villareal.

The following season the club qualified for the UEFA Champions League but were beat in the qualifying rounds by Rosenborg. They then played in the UEFA Cup group stages where they defeated teams like RC Lens, Heerenveen S.C., Real Betis in the group stages and one of their traditional Romanian rivals, Rapid București, in the quarter finals. FCSB played the semifinal but were beaten by Middlesbrough F.C. after two dramatic games.

In the 2006–07 season FCSB qualified for UEFA Champions League group stage, where they played Real Madrid, Olympique Lyonnais and Dynamo Kiev. However, Iacob suffered another injury in 2007 and did not manage to play any game in the Champions League.

He played 20 games in the European Cups with Steaua and scored 9 times.

At the start of 2008, he was transferred to 1. FC Kaiserslautern, in the 2nd Bundesliga, for €500,000. He was injured in his early days at his new team and did not manage to help them avoid relegation, despite playing a couple of matches. He also spent a few months at CS Otopeni.

Iraklis Thessaloniki
In the summer of 2009, Iacob moved to Iraklis Thessaloniki on a free transfer. He played 24 matches and scored 11 goals in his first season in Greece. Iacob became a fan-favourite. He had a poor disciplinary record however and was nine times and sent off five times. With the beginning of the 2009–10 season he was unable to offer his services (home against Olympiakos, Iraklis won 2–1) at his team due to his red card which he had received on the last match of the previous season. Iraklis' fans acknowledged his contribution giving him the player of the year award, in winter 2010 for the 2009–10 season.

In May 2011, he left the club, Iraklis have been blighted by financial problems which ultimately resulted in relegation from the top tier.

Aris FC
On 30 August 2011, Iacob signed a contract with Thessaloniki rivals, Aris FC.

Honours

Club
FCSB
Liga I: (1) 2005–06
Supercupa României: (1) 2005–06
UEFA Cup semifinalist: (1) 2005–06

References

External links
 
 

1980 births
Living people
Sportspeople from Râmnicu Vâlcea
Romanian footballers
Romania under-21 international footballers
Association football forwards
AFC Rocar București players
FC Progresul București players
FC U Craiova 1948 players
ASC Oțelul Galați players
FC Rapid București players
FC Steaua București players
1. FC Kaiserslautern players
CS Otopeni players
Iraklis Thessaloniki F.C. players
Aris Thessaloniki F.C. players
CS Concordia Chiajna players
Niki Volos F.C. players
Romanian expatriate footballers
Expatriate footballers in Germany
Expatriate footballers in Greece
Romanian expatriate sportspeople in Germany
Romanian expatriate sportspeople in Greece
Liga I players
Super League Greece players
2. Bundesliga players